The Rainbow Experiment is a 2018 American drama film directed by Christina Kallas, starring Connor Siemer, Richard Liriano, Patrick Bonck, Nina Mehta, Christine McLaughlin, Stratos Tzortzoglou, Lauren Sowa, Swann Gruen and Christian Coulson.

Cast
 Connor Siemer as Matty Fairchild
 Richard Liriano as JC Caraballo
 Patrick Bonck as Jess Williamson
 Nina Mehta as Lisa Dhawan
 Christine McLaughlin as Toni McKenna
 Stratos Tzortzoglou as Nicky Kazan
 Lauren Sowa as Allis Wilmore
 Swann Gruen as Ross Fairchild
 Christian Coulson as Adam Kazan
 Chris Beetem as Jamie Freeman
 Kevin Kane as David McKenna
 Francis Benhamou as Anna Guerrero

Release
The film premiered at the Slamdance Film Festival on 20 January 2018. It was released in the United States on 7 December.

Reception
Shelagh Rowan-Legg of ScreenAnarchy wrote that "By recounting these stories of the private and public politics, the emotional and the professional, Kallas asks her audience to understand and question how easily we think we can know what happened in any terrible accident."

Bill Arceneaux of Film Threat gave the film a score of 3 out of 5 wrote that Kallas is "completely capable of guiding with a strong editorial hand, the improv-heavy cast to its emotionally resonant and truly tense moments."

The Hollywood Reporter called the film "a year's worth of soap opera, condensed to 130 minutes."

References

External links
 
 

American drama films
2018 drama films